Thomas Michael "Tim" Scanlon (born 1940), usually cited as T. M. Scanlon, is an American philosopher.  At the time of his retirement in 2016, he was the Alford Professor of Natural Religion, Moral Philosophy, and Civil Polity in Harvard University's Department of Philosophy, where he had taught since 1984. He was elected to the American Philosophical Society in 2018.

Life and career
Scanlon was born on June 28, 1940 and grew up in Indianapolis, Indiana. He obtained his undergraduate degree from Princeton University in 1962;  earned his PhD in philosophy from Harvard under Burton Dreben in 1968; studied for a year at Oxford University on a Fulbright Scholarship; and returned to Princeton University, where he taught from 1966 until 1984. He was made a MacArthur Fellow in 1993.

His teaching in the department has included courses on theories of justice, equality, and recent ethical theory. His book, What We Owe to Each Other, was published by Harvard University Press in 1998; a collection of papers on political theory, The Difficulty of Tolerance, was published by Cambridge University Press in 2003.

Scanlon is the father-in-law of philosopher and African-American studies scholar Tommie Shelby.

Philosophical work

Scanlon's dissertation and some of his first papers were in mathematical logic, where his main concern was in proof theory, but he turned to ethics and political philosophy, where he developed a version of contractualism in the line of John Rawls, Immanuel Kant, and Jean-Jacques Rousseau.  Scanlon has also published important work on freedom of speech, equality, tolerance, foundations of contract law, human rights, conceptions of welfare, and theories of justice, as well as on foundational questions in moral theory.

Contractualism 

Contractualism is a constructivist attempt at providing a unified account of the subject matter of a central part of morality which Scanlon calls "what we owe to each other." The normative domain of what we owe to each other is meant to encompass those duties to other people which we bear in virtue of their standing as rational creatures. A broader conception of morality includes whatever else we may owe to specific people, such as the special obligations we bear in relations with friends and family, or whatever else morality may require of us, such as the way in which we treat ourselves or nature. Scanlon believes that what we owe to each other, or what we could loosely call "the morality of right and wrong", is distinct from this broader conception of morality in that contractualism provides a unified account of its content.

In this form of contractualism, judgements about right and wrong, unlike empirical judgements, are not theoretical claims about the nature of the spatiotemporal world but rather practical claims about what we have reason to do. Further, they are a particularly important class of practical claims in that the judgement that an action is wrong is taken to provide reasons to not do that action which are most often considered to be decisive against competing reasons. Following this point, Scanlon takes questions about the reason-giving force of moral judgements to be prior to questions about the subject matter of the morality of right and wrong. More explicitly, he thinks that if we provide an account of the extraordinary reason-giving force of moral judgements then this account could largely form the basis for a characterisation of the subject matter of what we owe to each other.

Scanlon grounds the reason-giving force of judgements about right and wrong in "the positive value of a way of living with others". A way of living with others which is typified by an ideal of mutual recognition between rational agents, where mutual recognition demands that moral agents acknowledge the value of human life and respond to this value in the right ways.

On the question of how ought we to value human, or rational, life, Scanlon argues that different valuable things require different ways of valuing. In contrast to teleological accounts of value, often to take something to be of value is not only to see reason to bring about a maximal amount of that thing. This is especially true when considering the value of human life. When we value human life, he writes, we do not see this as a reason to create as much human life as we can. Rather, we tend to see reason to respect other human beings, to protect them from death and other forms of harm and, in general, to want their lives to go well. More important for Scanlon, to value rational life is to recognize the features which distinguish rational life from other valuable things, specifically, the ability of rational creatures to assess reasons and judgements, and to govern their lives in accordance with these assessments. Scanlon asserts that the proper response to the recognition of these distinctive features is to treat rational creatures in terms of principles which they could not reasonably reject.

From this point, Scanlon's account of the value of rational life provides a focus around which his account of the reason-giving force of moral judgements dovetails quite neatly with a characterization of the method of reasoning which we use to arrive at judgements of right and wrong, a method, moreover, which seems to be phenomenologically plausible. The reason-giving force of moral judgements is grounded in an ideal of mutual recognition which requires treating others in accordance with principles that they could not reasonably reject. Because mutual recognition requires that these other people are also appropriately motivated, this entails Scanlon's formulation of wrongness: "An act is wrong if and only if any principle that permitted it would be one that could reasonably be rejected by people moved to find principles for the general regulation of behaviour that others, similarly motivated, could not reasonably reject". An act is right, quite simply, if a principle permitting it could not reasonably be rejected in terms of this contractualist formulation.

Regarding how moral principles are derived from the contractualist formulation, when considering whether a principle can be rejected we must take into account the consequences, in general, of its being accepted, not only the consequences of the particular actions that it allows. Because we cannot be sure about who will be affected by a principle, and how they will be affected, we must draw on our experience of life and consider the "generic reasons" which individuals are likely to have, as a result of their general circumstances, to reject a principle. In order to determine whether a principle is reasonably rejectable, we must impartially weigh these generic reasons against each other, and exercising our judgement, draw a conclusion about what the weight of reasons support. Given the motivation of finding principles for the general regulation of society that no-one could reasonably reject, if the weight of reasons support a certain conclusion then it would be unreasonable to reject that conclusion. Importantly, principles can only be rejected by individuals; aggregation of reasons across individuals is not allowed. So if the generic reasons of an individual carry more weight than any other individual's generic reasons, then his generic reasons are (for the most part) decisive in determining principles.

The generic reasons which are open to consideration under the contractualist formulation are any reasons which we judge as relevant to reasonable rejectability. This requires that we exercise our judgement in determining whether such reasons would be suitable grounds for mutual recognition. Therefore, that a principle would negatively affect a person's well-being is not the only kind of reason which may be brought against a principle. Other considerations, such as how a burden would be imposed by a principle, can serve as reasonable grounds for rejection.

While contractualism only provides an account of that central part of morality which deals with what we owe to each other, Scanlon writes that this part of morality is related to the broader realm of morality in complex ways. There is pressure for the morality of what we owe to each other to acknowledge the values included in the broader realm of morality insofar as principles which don't make room for these values could be reasonably rejected. In turn, these values must accommodate the dictates of what we owe to each other to the extent that they involve relations with others, who have separate moral standing.

Reasons Fundamentalism 
In his 2009 John Locke Lectures at Oxford, Scanlon argued in favor of what he calls "Reasons Fundamentalism." This is "the thesis that there are irreducibly normative truths about reasons for action." Scanlon refined and published this material in his book Being Realistic about Reasons.

In popular culture
Scanlon's What We Owe to Each Other is referenced several times in the American television series The Good Place, serving as the initial text used to instruct the protagonist Eleanor, who has apparently ended up in Heaven by mistake. The phrase "What We Owe to Each Other" is used as the title of the sixth episode of the first season, and that episode features a summary of Scanlon's ideas, as does the season two finale. Scanlon's ideas play a prominent role in the series finale, in which Eleanor finally finishes reading Scanlon's book and uses the principles of contractualism to explain a crucial decision that she makes.

Selected works

Books

Chapters in books
  Preview.
 
 
 
 
  Pdf.
 
  Pdf.
 Reprinted as: 
 Also available as:

Articles
 
 
 
 
 
  
  Pdf.
 
 
 
  See also Tanner lecture pdf.
  Pdf.
See also: 
  Pdf.
 
See also: 
See also: 
 
 
See also: 
See also: 
See also: 
See also: 
See also: 
  Pdf.
 
 
 
 
 
See also:

References

Sources
Interviews with Scanlon
 'The Kingdom of Ends on the Cheap' in Alex Voorhoeve Conversations on Ethics. Oxford University Press, 2009. 
 "Ethics of Blame"
 An Interview with T. M. Scanlon by Yascha Mounk, 2012-07-07.
 Interview with Fifteen Minutes Magazine, The Harvard Crimson. Asking Philosopher T. M. Scanlon ‘What We Owe to Each Other’

External links
 The Department of Philosophy at Harvard
 Contractualism at Stanford Encyclopedia of Philosophy, Ashford E, Mulgan T

1940 births
Living people
20th-century American philosophers
21st-century American philosophers
Analytic philosophers
American philosophy academics
American political philosophers
Harvard University alumni
Princeton University alumni
Princeton University faculty
Harvard University faculty
Proof theorists
Philosophers from Indiana
Writers from Indianapolis
Members of the American Philosophical Society
Presidents of the American Philosophical Association
MacArthur Fellows